Toxicoscordion fremontii, known as the common star lily or Frémont's deathcamas (after John C. Frémont) or star zigadene, is an attractive wildflower found on grassy or woody slopes, or rocky outcrops, in many lower-lying regions of California, southwestern Oregon, and northern Baja California.

Like other deathcamases, T. fremontii grows from a more or less spherical bulb, which in this species has a diameter of 20–35 mm. Its leaves can reach up to half a meter in length, but are typically half that length. They grow from the base of the plant.  Flowers, which can be seen from March to June, grow in clusters. They have six petals (strictly, three petals and three very similar sepals), arranged symmetrically, giving rise to the name star-lily.  Each flower is 1–4 cm across.

References

External links 
 Jepson manual species treatment
 CalPhotos Photos gallery, University of California
Santa Barbara Wildflowers, Toxicoscordion fremontii color photos and ecological information

fremontii
Flora of California
Flora of Baja California
Flora of Oregon
Flora of the Klamath Mountains
Natural history of the California chaparral and woodlands
Natural history of the California Coast Ranges
Natural history of the Channel Islands of California
Natural history of the Peninsular Ranges
Natural history of the San Francisco Bay Area
Natural history of the Santa Monica Mountains
Natural history of the Transverse Ranges
Plants described in 1857
Taxa named by John Torrey
Flora without expected TNC conservation status